All Roads to Pearla (formerly titled Sleeping in Plastic) is a 2019 American crime thriller drama film written and directed by Van Ditthavong and starring Addison Timlin.  It is Ditthavong's feature directorial debut.

Cast
Addison Timlin
Alex MacNicoll
Corin Nemec
Dash Mihok
Darryl Cox
Paige McGarvin
Nick Chinlund

Production
Filming occurred in Harrah, Oklahoma.

Release
The film had its world premiere at the 2019 Austin Film Festival.  Gravitas Ventures acquired North American distribution rights to the film in August 2020.  The film was released in limited theaters and on VOD on September 25, 2020.

Reception
Bobby LePire of Film Threat gave the film a 6.5 out of 10.

References

External links
 
 

2019 films
2019 crime drama films
2019 crime thriller films
American crime thriller films
American crime drama films
Films shot in Oklahoma
2010s English-language films
2010s American films